A Man of Action is a 2022 crime drama film directed by Javier Ruiz Caldera from a screenplay by Patxi Amezcua which stars Juan José Ballesta alongside Luis Callejo and Miki Esparbé. It is freely based on the life of Lucio Urtubia. It was released on Netflix on 30 November 2022.

Plot 
Taking place from the 1940s to the 1980s and primarily set in France, the plot is freely inspired by the life of Paris-based Spanish anarchist, bricklayer, and bank robber Lucio Urtubia, known for forging a large-scale scam aimed at the City Bank.

Cast

Production 
The film is an Ikiru Films, La Pulga y el Elefante, and La Terraza Films production. Sergi Vilanova took over cinematography duties. Shooting locations included Vigo (Galicia), Catalonia, and France.

Release 
A Man of Action was released on Netflix on 30 November 2022.

See also 
 List of Spanish films of 2022

References

External links 

2020s Spanish films
Spanish-language Netflix original films
Films set in the 20th century
Spanish crime drama films
Spanish biographical drama films
Films shot in Galicia (Spain)
Films shot in Catalonia
Films shot in France
Films set in France
Ikiru Films films
Films about anarchism